Canaro may refer to:

Places
 Canaro, Rovigo, Veneto, Italy

People
Francisco Canaro (1888–1964), Uruguayan violinist and tango orchestra leader
Mario Canaro (1903–1974), Uruguayan tango musician, a brother of Francisco Canaro
Er Canaro (born 1956), Italian torturer-murderer, dog coiffeur and cocaine addict